In the geometry of hyperbolic 5-space, the 24-cell honeycomb honeycomb is one of five paracompact regular space-filling tessellations (or honeycombs). It is called paracompact because it has infinite facets, whose vertices exist on 4-horospheres and converge to a single ideal point at infinity.  With Schläfli symbol {3,4,3,3,3}, it has three 24-cell honeycombs around each cell. It is dual to the 5-orthoplex honeycomb.

Related honeycombs
It is related to the regular Euclidean 4-space 24-cell honeycomb, {3,4,3,3}, and the hyperbolic 5-space order-4 24-cell honeycomb honeycomb.

See also 
 List of regular polytopes

References 
Coxeter, Regular Polytopes, 3rd. ed., Dover Publications, 1973. . (Tables I and II: Regular polytopes and honeycombs, pp. 294–296)
Coxeter, The Beauty of Geometry: Twelve Essays, Dover Publications, 1999  (Chapter 10: Regular honeycombs in hyperbolic space, Summary tables II,III,IV,V, p212-213)

Honeycombs (geometry)